The Coleosporiaceae are a family of rust fungi in the order Pucciniales. The family contains 6 genera and 131 species.

References

Pucciniales
Basidiomycota families
Taxa described in 1900